Komoq (also Romanized as Kamaq; also known as Kūmak) is a village in Sanjabad-e Jonubi Rural District, Firuz District, Kowsar County, Ardabil Province, Iran. At the 2006 census, its population was 166, in 34 families.

References 

Tageo

Towns and villages in Kowsar County